Endralazine is an antihypertensive of the hydrazinophthalazine chemical class. It is not approved for use in the United States.

References 

Antihypertensive agents
Carboxamides
Hydrazines
Pyridazines